KVSH (940 AM, "Heart City Radio") is a radio station licensed to serve Valentine, Nebraska, United States. The station, established in 1961, is currently owned by the Heart City Radio Company.

Programming
KVSH broadcasts a Full Service format including news, talk, and country music.

In addition to its regular programming, this station also broadcasts University of Nebraska Cornhuskers football games as an affiliate of the Husker Sports Network.

History
This station began broadcasting on March 5, 1961, with 500 watts of power on a frequency of 940 kHz.  The Valentine Broadcasting Company, owned by the Huse Publishing Company as part of a four-station group of radio stations across Nebraska, initially broadcast from studios in the Marian Hotel.  The station was assigned the KVSH call sign by the Federal Communications Commission.

By 1963, KVSH was authorized to increase its signal power to 5,000 watts but was still restricted to daytimer operation.  The Valentine Broadcasting Company sold KVSH to the Beef Country Company in a transaction that was consummated in October 1971.

In March 1990, the Beef Country Company announced an agreement to sell this station to the Heart City Radio Company.  The deal was approved by the FCC on May 21, 1990, and the transaction was consummated on June 6, 1990.

References

External links

VSH
Country radio stations in the United States
News and talk radio stations in the United States
Radio stations established in 1961
Cherry County, Nebraska
Full service radio stations in the United States